Jimmy Hebert (born 1 July 1972 in Paris) is a French former professional footballer who played as a midfielder.

He played on the professional level in Ligue 1 and Ligue 2 for USL Dunkerque and Stade Malherbe Caen.

External links

Living people
1972 births
Footballers from Paris
Association football midfielders
French footballers
Ligue 1 players
Ligue 2 players
Stade Malherbe Caen players